The Heat It Up Tour is the debut concert tour by American boy band 98°. The tour supports the group's second debut album, 98° and Rising. The tour lasted over nine months and visited the Americas, Asia, Australia and Europe.

Opening acts
Jessica Simpson 
B*Witched 
No Authority 
Joée 
Maestro 
The Refrigerators 
LP Outsiders

Setlist
The following setlist was obtained from the March 20, 1999 concert; held at the Centennial Hall in London, Ontario. It does not represent all concerts during the tour.
"Instrumental Introduction" 
"Heat It Up"
"Come and Get It"
"Pretty Fly (for a White Guy)" / "My Name Is" / "1999"
"Fly with Me"
"Still"
"If She Only Knew"	
"Invisible Man"
"She's Out of My Life"
"Do You Wanna Dance?"
"Superstition"
"True to Your Heart"
"I Can't Get Next To You"
"I Do (Cherish You)"
"Because of You"
"The Hardest Thing"

Tour dates

Festivals and other miscellaneous performances

KRBE/Enron Earth Day Festival
Nashville River Stages
Music Midtown
Endfest
Burlington Steamboat Days
National Cherry Festival
California Mid-State Fair
L'Oréal Paris Summer Music Mania '99
Sioux Empire Fair
Midland County Fair
State Fair of West Virginia
Erie County Fair
Hunter Mountain Summer Concert Series
Live at Waterloo Concert Series
Great New York State Fair
Michigan State Fair
Great Allentown Fair
Radio Disney Summer Concert Series
Last Chance Summer Dance
Allegan County Fair
York Fair
Western Fair
QConcert 1999
State Fair of Virginia
South Carolina State Fair
Arkansas State Fair
25th Anniversary Bash
B96 Halloween Bash
Wing Ding
Kissmas Party
Z104 Birthday
Jingle Ball

Cancellations and rescheduled shows

References

1999 concert tours